Netřebice is a municipality and village in Český Krumlov District in the South Bohemian Region of the Czech Republic. It has about 500 inhabitants.

Administrative parts
Villages of Dlouhá and Výheň are administrative parts of Netřebice.

References

Villages in Český Krumlov District